Irina Aleksandrovna Gerasimenok, (born 6 October 1970) is a Russian sport shooter, specializing in the rifles event. She won the silver medal at the 1996 Olympic Games in the 50 metre rifle three positions event.

Olympic results

External links
Profile on issfnews.com

1970 births
Living people
Russian female sport shooters
ISSF rifle shooters
Olympic shooters of Russia
Shooters at the 1996 Summer Olympics
Olympic silver medalists for Russia
Sportspeople from Moscow
Olympic medalists in shooting
Medalists at the 1996 Summer Olympics
20th-century Russian women